Winklespruit is a small seaside resort north of the mouth of the Illovo River in KwaZulu-Natal, South Africa. It forms part of eThekwini. On May 10, 1875 the schooner Tonga which was carrying wares for Durban was wrecked here. The sailors not wanting the cargo to go to waste set up a store on the river bank and sold the water damaged goods. The store was known by the Afrikaans as winkel (shop).

Transport 

The R102 named ‘Andrew Zondo Road’ (previously and popularly known as ‘Kingsway’) passes through Winklespruit as the main thoroughfare of the coastal village. The road links Winklespruit to Warner Beach, Doonside and Amanzimtoti in the north-east and Illovo Beach, Umgababa and Umkomaas in the south-west. 

The N2 highway passes Winklespruit to the west and links to Port Shepstone in the south-west and Amanzimtoti and Durban in the north-east. Access to Winklespruit from the N2 can be obtained through R603 interchange (Exit 133). 

The R603 named ‘Umbumbulu Road’ is a regional route beginning at the intersection with the R102 in Winklespruit and links the coastal village to Umbumbulu, Umlaas Road and Pietermaritzburg (via the N3 highway in Umlaas Road) in the north-west.

References

Populated places in eThekwini Metropolitan Municipality
Populated coastal places in South Africa
Populated places established in 1875
1875 establishments in South Africa